There have been several families who have been involved in South Indian cinema in a variety of professions related to the industry. For actors who featured in predominantly Hindi films rather than South Indian films, see List of Hindi film clans. Below is an incomplete list of families that have been involved in South Indian cinema.

A

Adivi family
Adivi Baapiraju, Indian polymath, novelist, fiction writer, and screen writer; cousin to Adivi Gangaraju
 Adivi Gangaraju, Nationalist, and Freedom fighter; Grandfather to Adivi Sesh
Adivi Sesh, Actor, Screenwriter, Director; Grandson of Adivi Gangaraju
Sai Kiran Adivi, Director; cousin to Adivi Sesh

Agathian family 
Agathian, director.
Kani Thiru, television personality; daughter of Agathian.
Thiru, director; husband of Kani
Vijayalakshmi Feroz, actress and television personality; daughter of Agathian.
 Feroz Mohammed, director; husband of Vijayalakshmi.
Niranjani Ahathian, actress and costume designer; daughter of Agathian.
Desingh Periyasamy, director; husband of Niranjani.

Ajith Kumar family 
Ajith Kumar, actor.
Shiva, actor; husband of Ajith's cousin, Priya.
Shalini, former actress; wife of Ajith Kumar.
Shamili, actress; sister of Shalini.
Richard, actor; brother of Shalini.

Akkineni family 

Akkineni Nageswara Rao, actor (d. 2014).
Nagarjuna, actor.
Daggubati Lakshmi, ex-wife of Nagarjuna
Amala, actress; wife of Nagarjuna.
Naga Chaitanya, actor; son of Nagarjuna and Daggubati Lakshmi. (see Daggubati family)
Samantha, actress; ex- wife of Naga Chaitanya.
Akhil, actor; son of Nagarjuna and Amala.
Sumanth, actor; nephew of Nagarjuna.
Sushanth, actor; nephew of Nagarjuna.

Ambareesh family 
Chowdiah, musician
Ambareesh, actor-politician, grand-nephew Chowdiah
Sumalatha, actress-Politician,  wife of Ambareesh
Abhishek Gowda, actor, son of Ambareesh and Sumalatha

Anant Nag family

 Anant Nag, actor and producer
Gayathri, actress and wife of Ananth Nag
 Shankar Nag, actor, director and producer, younger brother of Anant Nag
Arundhati Nag, actress, theater artist and wife of Shankar Nag

Anandan family 
C. L. Anandan, actor (d. 1989).
Disco Shanthi, actress; daughter of C. L. Anandan.
Srihari, actor; husband of Disco Shanthi. (d. 2013)
Lalitha Kumari, actress, daughter of C. L. Anandan.
Prakash Raj, actor; ex-husband of Lalitha Kumari.
Pony Verma, choreographer; wife of Prakash Raj.
Prasad Raj, actor; brother of Prakash Raj.

Asif Ali family
 Asif Ali, actor
Askar Ali, actor, younger brother of Asif

Azhagappan family 
A. L. Azhagappan, producer.
A. L. Vijay, director; son of Azhagappan.
R. Aishwarya, wife of A. L. Vijay.
Amala Paul, actress; ex-wife of Vijay.
Udhaya, film actor; son of Azhagappan.
Keerthika Udhaya, dubbing artiste; wife of Udhaya.

B

Balasubrahmanyam family 
S. P. Balasubrahmanyam, playback singer (d. 2020)
S. P. B. Pallavi, playback singer; daughter of S. P. Balasubrahmanyam.
S. P. B. Charan, playback singer; son of S. P. Balasubrahmanyam.
S. P. Sailaja, playback singer; sister of S. P. Balasubrahmanyam.
Subhalekha Sudhakar, actor; husband of S. P. Sailaja.
K. Viswanath, actor and director; uncle of S. P. Balasubrahmanyam.
Chandra Mohan, actor; cousin of K. Viswanath.

Bhagyaraj family 
K. Bhagyaraj, director.
Praveena Bhagyaraj (d. 1983), actress; late wife of Bhagyaraj
Poornima Bhagyaraj, actress; wife of Bhagyaraj
Saranya Bhagyaraj, actress; daughter of Bhagyaraj
Shanthnu Bhagyaraj, actor; son of Bhagyaraj
Keerthi Vijay, television personality; wife of Shanthnu. (see Subramanyam family)

Bhanupriya family 
Bhanupriya, actress.
Vindhya, actress; sister-in-law of Bhanupriya.
Shantipriya, actress; sister of Bhanupriya.
Siddharth Ray (d. 2004), actor; husband of Shantipriya.
V. Shantaram (d. 1990), director; grandfather of Siddhanth Ray.

Bharathiraja family 
Bharathiraja, actor and director.
Jayaraj, actor; brother of Bharathiraja
Manoj Bharathiraja, director; son of Bharathiraja.
Nandana, actress; wife of Manoj.
Manoj Kumar, director; brother-in-law of Director Bharathiraja.

C

Vijay family 
S. A. Chandrasekhar, director
Xavier Britto, entrepreneur; brother-in-law of Chandrasekhar.
Sneha Britto, director; daughter of Xavier Britto. (see Murali family)
Atharvaa, actor; brother-in-law of Sneha Britto
Shoba Chandrasekhar, playback singer; wife of Chandrasekhar.
Sheela, actress; sister of Shoba.
Sanjeev, director; son of Sheela.
Vikranth, actor; son of Sheela.
Manasa, actress; wife of Vikranth.
Kanakadurga, actress; mother of Manasa.
S. N. Surendar, voice actor; brother of Shoba.
Viraj, actor; son of Surendar.
S. N. Surendar, writer; brother of Shoba.
Vijay, actor; son of Chandrasekhar.
Jason Sanjay; son of Vijay.

Cho Ramaswamy family 
Cho Ramaswamy, actor.
Ramya Krishnan, actress; niece of Cho Ramaswamy.
Krishna Vamsi, director; husband of Ramya Krishna.

Choudary family 
R. B. Choudary, producer.
Jithan Ramesh, actor; son of Choudary.
Jiiva, actor; son of Choudary.

Chittajallu family 
C. Pullaiah, director
C. S. Rao, director, actor and writer; son of C. Pullaiah.
Rajasulochana, actress and classical dancer; wife of C.S. Rao.

D

Daggubati Family 

D. Rama Naidu, producer.
Daggubati Suresh Babu, producer; son of Ramanaidu.
Rana Daggubati, actor; son of Daggubati Suresh Babu.
Miheeka Daggubati, wife of Rana Daggubati 
Venkatesh, actor; son of Ramanaidu.
Nagarjuna, actor, son-in-law of Ramanaidu
Naga Chaitanya, actor, grandson of Ramanaidu. (see Akkineni family)
Samantha Akkineni, actress, ex-wife of Naga Chaitanya, daughter in law of Nagarjuna
Akhil Akkineni, actor, half-brother of Naga Chaitanya

Deva family 
Deva, music director.
Murali, music director; brother of Deva.
Sabesh, music director; brother of Deva.
Srikanth Deva, music director; son of Deva.
Febi, playback singer; wife of Srikanth Deva.
Sangeetha Bhaskar, playback singer; daughter of Deva.
Parthi Bhaskar, director; husband of Sangeetha. (see Ilaiyaraaja family)
Bobo Shashi, music director; son of Murali.
Karthik Sabesh, actor; son of Sabesh
Jai, actor; nephew of Deva.

Deve Gowda family 
H. D. Deve Gowda, politician.
H. D. Revanna, politician; son of Deve Gowda.
Prajwal Revanna, politician; son of H. D. Revanna.
H. D. Kumaraswamy, producer and politician; son of Deve Gowda.
Anitha Kumaraswamy, producer; wife of Kumaraswamy.
Radhika kumarswamy, actress; second wife of Kumaraswamy.
Nikhil Gowda, actor; son of Kumaraswamy and Anitha Kumarswamy
  Revathi Nikhil; wife of Nikhil Gowda
  Shamika Kumarswamy; daughter of Radhika and Kumarswamy

Dileep Family 
Dileep, actor; producer; businessman
Manju Warrier, actress; ex-wife of Dileep
Kavya Madhavan, actress; wife of Dileep

F

Fazil family 
Fazil, director.
Fahadh Faasil, actor, son of Fazil
Nazriya Nazim, actress, wife of Fahadh Faasil
Naveen Nazim, actor, brother of Nazriya, brother-in-law of Fahadh.
Farhaan Faasil, actor, son of Fazil, brother of Fahadh Faasil

G

Ghattamaneni family 
Krishna, actor.
Indira Devi, film producer, first wife of Krishna, mother of Ramesh Babu, Mahesh Babu, and Manjula
Vijaya Nirmala, actress; second wife of Krishna (see Nidudavolu family)
Ramesh Babu, actor; son of Krishna.
Manjula, producer; daughter of Krishna.
Mahesh Babu, actor; son of Krishna
Namrata Shirodkar, actress; wife of Mahesh Babu.
Shilpa Shirodkar, actress; sister of Namrata.
Meenakshi Shirodkar, actress; grandmother of Namrata.
Sudheer Babu, actor; son-in-law of Krishna.

Ghantasala Family 
Ghantasala Sai Srinivas, widely known as S. Thaman, composer, multi instrumentalist, conductor singer-songwriter, actor, and music producer.
Ghantasala Balaramayya Grandfather to S. Thaman
Ghantasala Siva Kumar, Composer and drummer, son of Ghantasala Balaramayya 
Ghantasala Savitri, Playback singer, wife of Ghantasala Siva Kumar, mother to S. Thaman
Ghantasala Sri Vardhini, Playback singer, wife of S. Thaman
B. Vasantha, Playback singer, Aunt of S. Thaman.

Gemini Ganesan family 
Muthulakshmi Reddy, aunt of Gemini ganeshan
Gemini Ganesan, actor (d. 2005).
Pushpavalli, actress; partner of Gemini Ganesan.
Savitri Ganesan, actress; second wife of Gemini Ganesan.
Rekha, actress; daughter of Gemini Ganesan and Pushpavalli.
Gigi, actress; daughter of Gemini Ganesan 
Abhinay Vaddi, actor, grandson of Gemini Ganesan and Savitri.
Medha Raghunath, actress; granddaughter-in-law of Gemini Ganesan.
Madhuvanti Arun, actress; granddaughter-in-law of Gemini Ganesan (see Vyjanthimala family).

Gowda family 
K. C. N. Gowda, producer. (d. 2012)
K. C. N. Chandrasekhar, producer; son of KCN Gowda.
K. C. N. Mohan, producer; son of KCN Gowda.
 Poornima Mohan  (d. 2017), director; wife of K. C. N. Mohan.

H

Haasan family 
Kamal Haasan, Actor, film producer, film director, screenwriter, playback singer, lyricist, television presenter, choreographer, dancer, philanthropist & politician
Vani Ganapathy, actress; ex-wife of Kamal Haasan.
Sarika Thakur, actress; ex-wife of Kamal Haasan.
Shruti Haasan, actress & singer; daughter of Kamal Haasan and Sarika.
Akshara Haasan, actress; daughter of Kamal Haasan and Sarika.
Gautami Tadimalla, actress; ex-partner of Kamal Haasan.
Charuhasan, actor; brother of Kamal Haasan.
Komalam, actress; wife of Charuhasan.
Suhasini, actress; daughter of Charuhasan and Komalam.
Mani Ratnam, director; husband of Suhasini.
G. Venkateswaran, producer (d. 2003); brother of Mani Ratnam.
G. Srinivasan, producer (d. 2007); brother of Mani Ratnam.
Chandrahasan, producer (d. 2017); brother of Kamal Haasan.
Geethamani; wife of Chandrahasan.
Anu Haasan, actress; daughter of Chandrahasan.
 Nalini Raghu, dancer; sister of Kamal Haasan.
Gautam Kanthadai, actor; son of Nalini Raghu
Rama Ramasamy, actress; cousin of Kamal Haasan.

Hunsur family 
Hunsur Krishnamurthy, producer and director. (d. 1989)
H. R. Bhargava, director; cousin of Hunsur Krishnamurthy.
Dwarakish, actor
Giri Dwarakish, actor; son of Dwarakish.

I

Ilaiyaraaja family 
Ilaiyaraaja, music director.
Karthik Raja, music director; son of Ilaiyaraaja.
Yatheeswaran, playback singer; son of Karthik Raja.
Yuvan Shankar Raja, music director; son of Ilaiyaraaja.
Zafroon Nizar, costume designer; wife of Yuvan.
Bhavatharani, playback singer; daughter of Ilaiyaraaja.
Gangai Amaran, music director; brother of Ilaiyaraaja.
Venkat Prabhu, director; son of Gangai Amaran.
Premji Amaran, actor; son of Gangai Amaran.
R. D. Bhaskar, producer; brother of Ilaiyaraaja.
Parthi Bhaskar, director; son of Bhaskar.
Sangeetha Bhaskar, playback singer; wife of Parthi. (see Deva family)
Hari Bhaskar, playback singer; son of Bhaskar.
Vasuki Bhaskar, costume designer; daughter of Bhaskar.
Pavalar Varadharajan, music director; half-brother of Ilaiyaraaja.
Ilaiya Gangai, music director; son of Pavalar Varadharajan.
Pavalar Shiva, music director; son of Pavalar Varadharajan.
Jo V, director; son of Pavalar Varadharajan.

Iyer family
Sundaram Iyer, actor.
S. Rajam, actor; son of Iyer. (d.2010)
S. Balachander, director; son of Iyer. (d.1990)
S. Jayalakshmi, actress; daughter of Iyer. (d.2007)
Jayashree, actress; granddaughter of Jayalakshmi.

J

Jaggesh family 
Jaggesh, actor, director.
Gururaj Jaggesh, actor; son of Jaggesh
Yathiraj Jaggesh, actor; son of Jaggesh
 Komal Kumar, actor; brother of Jaggesh

Jayan family 
Jayan, Malayalam actor.
Jayabharathi, actress, Cousin of Jayan.
Hari Pothen, producer; ex-husband of Jayabharathi.
Pratap Pothen, actor; brother of Hari. (see Radha family)
Sathaar, actor; ex-husband of Jayabharathi.
Krish J. Sathaar, actor; son of Jayabharathi and Sathaar.
Adithya Jayan, actor; nephew of Jayan.
Munna, actor; nephew of Jayabharathi.
Ajayan, actor, younger brother of Jayan .

Jayachitra family 
Jayachitra, actress
Amresh Ganesh, actor and music composer; son of Jayachitra
Jayasree, actress; mother of Jayachitra

Jayadev family 
Devayani, actress; daughter of Jayadev.
Rajakumaran, director; husband of Devayani.
Nakul, actor; brother of Devayani.
Mayur, actor; brother of Devayani.

Jayaram family 
Jayaram, actor
Parvathy Jayaram, actress; wife of Jayaram
Kalidas Jayaram, actor, son of Jayaram and Parvathy

Jeeva family 
Jeeva, cinematographer. (d.2007)
Aneez Jeeva, costume designer; wife of Jeeva.
Vasanth, director; Husband of Jeeva's Sister.
Ritvik Varun, actor; son of Vasanth.

K

Kalabhavan Abi family
Kalabhavan Abi, actor (d. 2017)
Shane Nigam, actor, son of Kalabhavan Abi

Kallara Sarasamma family
Kallara Sarasamma, politician and wife of Kunjan Nair
Radha, actress; daughter of Sarasamma and Kunjan Nair
Rajasekaran Nair, entrepreneur and restaurateur
Karthika Nair, actress; daughter of Radha and Rajasekaran Nair
Thulasi Nair, actress; daughter of Radha and Rajasekaran Nair
Ambika, actress; daughter of Sarasamma and Kunjan Nair
Ravikanth, actor, ex-husband of Ambika
Suresh Nair, director; son of Sarasamma and Kunjan Nair
Gauri Nambiar, actress; cousin of Karthika

Kamesh family 
Kamala Kamesh, actress
Uma Riyaz Khan, actress; daughter of Kamesh.
Riyaz Khan, actor; husband of Uma.
Shariq Khan, actor; son of Riyaz and Uma.
Samshad Khan, actor; son of Riyaz and Uma.

Kannadasan family
Kannadasan, poet
Parvathi Kannadhasan, Wife of Kannadhasan
Ponnammal Kannadhasan , Wife of kannadhasan
Gandhi Kannadhasan, publisher, son of kannadhasan
Dr.kamal Kannadhasan, Dental Professor, son of kannadhsan
Srinivasan Kannadhasan, Agri Officer, son of kannadhasan
Muthiah Kannadhasan, actor, grand son of Kannadhasan
Vishali Kannadasan, writer; daughter of Kannadasan
Annadurai Kannadasan,writer,producer, lyric writer,director actor, son of Kannadasan
Kanmani Subbu, poet and writer; son of Kannadasan
Kalaivanan Kannadasan, director; son of Kannadasan
Aadhav Kannadasan, actor; son of Kalaivanan Kannadasan
Panchu Arunachalam, poet, screenwriter, producer; nephew of Kannadasan
Subbu Panchu, actor, producer; son of Panchu Arunachalam
Revathi Shanmugam, anchor; daughter of Kannadasan
Sathyalakshmi Kannadasan, producer; granddaughter of Kannadasan

Karunanidhi family 
M. Karunanidhi, Former chief minister of Tamil Nadu 
wife [rasathi ammal] 
M. K. Muthu, actor; son of Karunanidhi
M. K. Alagiri, politician; son of Karunanidhi.
M. K. Stalin, Politician and current chief minister of Tamil Nadu; actor; son of Karunanidhi.
M.K.Tamilarasu, Producer; Businessman; son of Karunanidhi.
Arivunidhi, playback singer; son of Muthu.
Dhayanidhi Alagiri, producer; son of Alagiri.
Anusha Dhayanidhi, playback singer; wife of Dhayanidhi Alagiri.
Udhayanidhi Stalin, Actor; Producer; Politician and Current Minister; son of Stalin.
Kiruthiga Udhayanidhi, director; wife of Udhayanidhi Stalin.
Arulnithi, actor; son of Tamilarasu.
Kanimozhi, politician; Daughter of Karunanidhi
Gunanidhi Amirtham, producer; grandson of Karunanidhi.
Murasoli Maran, director; nephew of Karunanidhi.
Kalanidhi Maran, producer; Business Man; son of Murasoli Maran.
Dayanidhi Maran, politician; son of Murasoli Maran.
C. S. Jayaraman, playback singer; father-in-law of Muthu.
Akshita Vikram, playback singer; granddaughter-in-law of Muthu. (see Thiagarajan family)

Karunas family 
Karunas, actor.
Grace Karunas, playback singer; wife of Karunas.
Ken Karunas, actor; son of Karunas.

Kasthuri Raja family 
Kasthuri Raja, director.
Selvaraghavan, director; son of Kasthuri Raja.
Sonia Agarwal, actress; ex-wife of Selvaragahvan.
Gitanjali Selvaraghavan, director; wife of Selvaragahvan.
Mohan V. Raman, actor; uncle of Gitanjali.
Vidyullekha Raman, actress; daughter of Mohan.
Vimalageetha, producer; daughter of Kasthuri Raja.
Dhanush, actor; son of Kasthuri Raja.
Aishwarya Rajinikanth, producer; director; daughter of Rajinikanth; wife of Dhanush.
Karthiga Karthik; Doctor ; daughter of Kasthuri Raja

Kunchacko family 
Kunchacko, director and producer. (d.1976)
Boban Kunchacko, actor, producer and director; son of Kunchacko. (d.2004)
Kunchacko Boban, actor and producer; grandson of Kunchacko
Navodaya Appachan, director and producer; brother of Kunchacko. (d.2012)
Jijo Punnoose, actor, producer and director; son of Appachan
Jose Appachan, actor, producer and director; son of Appachan

Koduri family 
Siva Shakthi Datta, lyricist; elder brother of V. Vijayendra Prasad
M. M. Keeravani, music director; son of Siva Shakthi Datta
M. M. Srivalli, line producer; wife of Keeravani and elder sister of Rama Rajamouli
Kaala Bhairava, singer and music director; elder son of Keeravani
Sri Simha, actor; younger son of Keeravani
Kalyani Malik, music director; son of Siva Shakthi Datta, younger brother of Keeravani
V. Vijayendra Prasad, writer; younger brother of Siva Shakti Datta
S. S. Rajamouli, director; son of V. Vijayendra Prasad.
Rama Rajamouli, costume designer; wife of S. S. Rajamouli and younger sister of M. M. Srivalli
S. S. Karthikeya, assistant director, production manager; son of Rama through her previous marriage and adopted son of Rajamouli
M. M. Srilekha, music director; cousin of Rajamouli and Keeravani.
S. S. Kanchi, writer; cousin of Rajamouli and Keeravani.
Raja Koduri, tech executive; cousin of Rajamouli and Keeravani.

Komal Swaminathan family 
Komal Swaminathan, director. (d.1995)
Anand Shankar, director; grandson of Swaminathan.
Srikanth Ravichandran, director; cousin of Anand Shankar.
Dhivyadharshini, actress; ex-wife of Srikanth.

Konidela–Allu family 

Chiranjeevi, actor and politician.
Ram Charan, actor, producer; businessman; son of Chiranjeevi. 
Upasana Konidela, businesswoman; wife of Ram Charan.
Susmitha, costume designer; daughter of Chiranjeevi.
Srija, daughter of Chiranjeevi
Kalyaan Dhev, actor; husband of Srija
Nagendra Babu, actor, producer; younger brother of Chiranjeevi.
Varun Tej, actor; son of Nagendra Babu.
Niharika Konidela, actress; daughter of Nagendra Babu.
Pawan Kalyan, actor, filmmaker, and politician; younger brother of Chiranjeevi.
Anna Lezhneva, wife of Pawan Kalyan.
Renu Desai, actress; ex-wife of Pawan Kalyan.
Sai Dharam Tej, actor; nephew of Chiranjeevi.
 Panja Vaisshnav Tej, actor; younger brother of Sai Dharam Tej
Allu Rama Lingaiah, actor; father-in-law of Chiranjeevi.
Allu Aravind, producer; Son of Allu Rama Lingaiah

Allu Arjun, actor; Son of Allu Aravind.
Allu Sirish, actor; Son of Allu Aravind.

Krish family 
Krish, playback singer.
Sangeetha, actress; wife of Krish.
Parimal, actor; brother of Sangeetha.
K. R. Balan, producer; grandfather of Sangeetha.

Kottarakkara family 
Kottarakkara Sreedharan Nair, actor
Sai Kumar, son of Kottarakkara
Prasannakumari, ex-wife of Saikumar
Bindu Panicker, wife of Sai Kumar
Shobha Mohan, daughter of Kottarakkara 
Vinu Mohan, actor, Shobha's son
Vidhya Mohan, actress, Vinu's wife
Anu Mohan, actor, Shobha's son

L

Lakshminarayana family
V. Lakshminarayana (d. 1990), musician
L. Vaidyanathan (d. 2007), composer; son of Lakshminarayana
L. V. Ganesan, composer; son of Vaidyanathan
L. V. Muthukumarasamy, composer; son of Vaidyanathan
L. Shankar, violinist; son of Lakshminarayana
L. Subramaniam, violinist; son of Lakshminarayana
Viji Subramaniam (d. 1995), vocalist; wife of Subramaniam
Kavita Krishnamurthy, singer; wife of Subramaniam

Lokesh family 
Subbaiah Naidu, actor. (d. 1962).
Lokesh, actor. (d. 2004).
Girija Lokesh, actress; wife of Lokesh.
Srujan Lokesh, actor and anchor.
Pooja Lokesh, actress.

Lokesh (Mysore Lokesh) family 
Mysore Lokesh, actor
Pavitra Lokesh, actress.
Suchendra Prasad, actor; ex-husband of Pavitra Lokesh.
Naresh, actor, husband of Pavitra Lokesh, son of Vijaya Nirmala (see Nidudavolu family)
Aadi Lokesh, actor

M

MGR Family 
M. G. Ramachandran, actor, politician, Former Chief minister of Tamil Nadu
V. N. Janaki Ramachandran, actress; wife of MGR and Former Chief Minister of Tamil Nadu
M. G. Chakrapani, actor; brother of MGR
M. G. C. Sukumar, actor; son of Chakrapani
Ramachandran, actor; grand-nephew of MGR

Madhavan family 
O. Madhavan, stage actor
Vijayakumari, actress, wife of O. Madhavan
Sandhya Rajendran, actress, daughter of Madhavan and Vijayakumari 
E.A. Rajendran, actor, husband of Sandhya
Divyadarshan, actor, son of Sandhya and Rajendran
Mukesh, actor, son of Madhavan and Vijayakumari
Saritha, actress, ex-wife of Mukesh
Viji Chandrasekhar, actress, sister of Saritha.
Shravan Mukesh, actor, son of Mukesh and Saritha
Methil Devika, dancer, ex-wife of Mukesh

Mammootty family 
Mammootty, actor.
Dulquer Salmaan, actor, son of Mammooty.
Ibrahim Kutty, actor, brother of Mammooty.
Maqbool Salmaan, actor, son of Ibrahim Kutty
Ashkar Saudan, actor, nephew of Mammootty

Manchu family 
Manchu Mohan Babu, actor
Lakshmi Manchu, actress, daughter of Mohan Babu
Andy Srinivasan, son-in-law of Mohan Babu 
Vidya Nirvana Manchu Anand, daughter of Lakshmi Manchu and Andy Srinivasan
Vishnu Manchu, actor, son of Mohan Babu
Viranica Reddy, wife of Manchu Vishnu
Ariana and Viviana, twin daughters of Manchu Vishnu and Viranica Reddy
Avram, son of Manchu Vishnu and Viranica Reddy
Ayra, daughter of Manchu Vishnu and Viranica Reddy
Manoj Manchu, actor; son of Mohan Babu.

Mohan family 
Mohan, editor.
M. Raja, director; son of Mohan.
Jayam Ravi, actor; son of Mohan.
Pranav Mohan, actor; son of Raja.
Aarav, actor; son of Ravi.
Aarti Ravi, costume designer; wife of Ravi.
Sujatha Vijayakumar, producer; mother-in-law of Ravi.

Mohanlal-Balaji family 
 K. Balaji, producer; father-in-law of Mohanlal.
 Suchitra Mohanlal, producer; daughter of K. Balaji, wife of Mohanlal.
 Mohanlal, actor, producer.
 Pranav Mohanlal, actor; son of Mohanlal and Suchitra
 Vismaya Mohanlal, Author ; daughter of mohanlal and Suchitra
 Suresh Balaje, producer; son of K. Balaji.
 Sitara Suresh, producer; daughter of Suresh Balaje.
Y. G. Parthasarathy, actor; brother-in-law of Balaji (see Rajinikanth family).

Murali family 
Siddalingaiah, director. (d.2015)
Murali, actor; son of Siddalingaiah. (d.2010)
Atharvaa Murali, actor; son of Murali.
Akash Murali, actor; son of Murali.
Sneha Britto, director; wife of Akash. (see Chandrasekhar family)
Daniel Balaji, actor; cousin of Murali.

Muthuraman family 
R. Muthuraman, actor. (d. 1982)
Karthik, actor; son of Muthuraman.
 Ragini, actress; wife of Karthik.
Gautham Karthik, actor; son of Karthik.
 Manjima Mohan, actress; wife of gautham karthik(m.28 nov 2022)

N

N.N. Pillai family
N.N. Pillai, Playwright, actor, theatre director, orator, screenplay writer, & lyricist. (d. 1995)
Vijayaraghavan, actor; son of N.N. Pillai.

Nagendra Rao family 
R. Nagendra Rao, actor (d. 1977).
R. N. Jayagopal, director and poet (d. 2008); son of Nagendra Rao.
R. N. K. Prasad, cinematographer and actor (d. 2012); son of Nagendra Rao.
R. N. Sudarshan, actor (d. 2017); son of Nagendra Rao.
Shylashri, actress; wife of Sudharshan.

Nagesh family 
Nagesh, actor. (d. 2009)
Anand Babu, actor; son of Nagesh.
Bijesh, actor; son of Anand Babu.
Gajesh, actor; son of Anand Babu.

Nandamuri family 
 Nandamuri Taraka Rama Rao (28 May 1923 – 18 January 1996), popularly known as NTR, was a Telugu cinema actor, filmmaker and politician who served as Chief Minister of Andhra Pradesh over three terms.
 N. Trivikrama Rao, producer; brother of NTR.
 Basavatarakam, Wife of NTR 
 Nandamuri Ramakrishna Sr., actor; son of NTR (deceased)
 Nandamuri Jayakrishna, cinematographer; son of NTR
 Nandamuri Saikrishna, theatre owner; son of NTR (deceased)
 Nandamuri Jayashankar Krishna; actor; son of NTR (deceased)
 Nandamuri Harikrishna, actor, politician; son of NTR (deceased)
 Nandamuri Suhasini, politician; daughter of Nandamuri Harikrishna
 Nandamuri Kalyan Ram, actor; son of Nandamuri Harikrishna
 Nandamuri Taraka Rama Rao (Junior), actor;  son of Nandamuri Harikrishna
 Nandamuri Janaki Ram, film maker (deceased)
 Nandamuri Mohanakrishna, cinematographer; son of NTR
 Nandamuri Taraka Ratna, actor; son of Nandamuri Mohanakrishna (deceased)
 Nandamuri Balakrishna, actor, politician; son of NTR
 Nara Brahmani (Executive Director Heritage Foods Ltd), daughter of Nandamuri Balakrishna, married to Nara Lokesh
 Mathukumilli Tejaswini
 Nandamuri Mokshagna Teja
 Nandamuri Ramakrishna Jr., producer; son of NTR
 Nara Bhuvaneshwari, daughter of NTR
 Nara Chandrababu Naidu, politician; married to Bhuvaneshwari
Nara Lokesh, politician; son of Nara Chandrababu Naidu) and Bhuvaneshwari
Nara Rohit, actor; nephew of Chandrababu
 Daggubati Purandeswari, politician; daughter of NTR
 Daggubati Venkateswara Rao, politician; married to Daggubati Purandeswari

 Nandamuri Lokeswari, Daughter of NTR
 Nandamuri Uma Maheswari, Daughter of NTR

Narayan family 
S. Narayan, actor and director.
Pankaj Narayan, actor; son of Narayan.

Nassar family 
Nassar, actor.
Kameela Nassar, producer; wife of Nassar.
Luthfudeen Baasha, actor; son of Nassar.
Abi Mehdhi Hassan, actor; son of Nassar.

Naval family 
Simran, actress.
Deepak, actor; husband of Simran.
Monal, actress; sister of Simran (d. 2002)
Jyothi Naval, actress; sister of Simran.

Nidudavolu family
Nidudavolu Venkatarao Indian littérateur, son of Sundaram Pantalu, brother of Vishalakshi
Nidudavolu Rameshwara Rao, son of Venkatarao, husband of actress Joga Bai
Jayasudha, actress, daughter of Rameshwara Rao and Joga Bai, granddaughter of Nidudavolu Venkatarao, ex-wife of Vadde Ramesh's brother-in-law, Rajendra Prasad, widow of Nitin Kapoor (see Kapoor family)
Vijaya Nirmala, actress, paternal niece of Nidudavolu Venkatarao, Aunt to Jayasudha, wife of Krishna (see Ghattamaneni family)
Vijaya Krishna Naresh, actor, son of Vijaya Nirmala
Srinu Master, choreographer, father of Naresh's first wife
Naveen Vijayakrishna, actor, son of Naresh with his first wife
Rekha Supriya, granddaughter of poet Devulapalli Krishna Shastri, second wife of Naresh, mother of Teja Vijayakrishna
Ramya Raghupathi, niece of Raghuveera Reddy, cousin of Aadarsh Balakrishna, Prashanth Neel, and Sriimurali's wife Vidya (see Rajkumar family)
Pavithra Lokesh, actress, daughter of Mysore Lokesh, ex-wife of V. Suchendra Prasad, Naresh's fiancée and soon-to-be 4th wife (see Lokesh family)
Raavu Vishalakshi, sister of Venkatarao, wife of Raavu Parthasarthy
Raavu Balasaraswathi, singer, daughter of Vishalakshi, concubine of the Raja of Kolanka

Jagannatha Rao Nidadavolu, cousin of Venkatarao (his father was the brother of Venkatarao's father Sundaram Pantalu)
Nidadavolu Malathi, Indian littérateur, novelist, daughter of Jagannatha Rao
Velcheru Narayana Rao, author, professor, critic, researcher, translator, husband of Nidadavolu Malathi
Sarayu Rao, Hollywood actress, daughter of Nidadavolu Malathi and Velcheru Narayana Rao

P

Pandian family
Arun Pandian, actor
Durai Pandian, Film director
Divya, actress; elder daughter of Durai Pandian
Ramya Pandian, actress; second daughter of Durai Pandian
Kavitha Pandian, producer; daughter of Arun Pandian
Yuva Krishna, actor; ex-husband of Kavitha
Kirana Pandian, producer; daughter of Arun Pandian
Keerthi Pandian, actress; daughter of Arun Pandian
Driya Pandian, actress; granddaughter of Arun Pandian

Panthulu family
B. R. Panthulu, producer and director
B. R. Vijayalakshmi, cinematographer and director; daughter of Panthulu
B. R. Ravishankar, director; son of Panthulu

Parthiban family 
Parthiban, actor.
Seetha, actress; ex-wife of Parthiban.
P. S. Keerthana, actress; daughter of Parthiban.

Peethambaram family 
Peethambaram Nair, make-up man (d. 2011)
P. Vasu, director; son of Peethambaram.
Sakthi Vasu, actor; son of Vasu.
Ramu, make-up artiste; father-in-law of Vasu.
Gautham V. R., director; grandson of Peethambaram.

Pinnisetty family 
Ravi Raja Pinisetty, director.
Sathya Prabhas Pinisetty, director; son of Ravi Raja.
Aadhi, actor; son of Ravi Raja.
Nikki Galrani, actress, wife of Aadhi Pinisetty

Pothineni family 
Ram Pothineni, actor.
Sravanthi Ravi Kishore, producer; Uncle of Ram.
Sharwanand Myneni, actor; Cousin of Ram.

Pudipeddi family 
P. J. Sarma, actor. (d. 2014).
Saikumar, actor and voice actor.
Aadi, actor; son of Saikumar.
P. Ravishankar, actor and voice actor.

Priyadarshan Family 
Priyadarshan, Director.
Lissy, Actress, Ex-wife of Priyadarshan.
Kalyani Priyadarshan, Actress, Daughter of Lissy and Priyadarshan

R

Radha family 
M. R. Radha, actor (d. 1979).
M. R. R. Vasu, actor: son of M. R. Radha.
Vasu Vikram, actor; son of M. R. Vasu.
Radharavi, actor; son of M. R. Radha.
Hari Radharavi, actor; son of Radharavi.
Radhika, actress; daughter of M. R. Radha.
Rayane, Grand daughter, daughter of Radhika sarathkumar
Rahul Sarathkumar, Grandson, son of Radhika and Sarathkumar
Sarath Kumar, actor; husband of Radhika
Varalaxmi Sarathkumar, actor; Daughter of Sharath Kumar
Nirosha, actress; daughter of M. R. Radha.
Ramki, actor; husband of Nirosha.
Ike Radha, director; grandson of M. R. Radha. 
Joshna Fernando, actress; niece of M. R. Radha.

Rahman family 
A. R. Rahman, music director.
R. K. Shekhar, musician; Rahman's father.
A. R. Reihana, playback singer; sister of Rahman.
Israth Kadhiri, playback singer; sister of Rahman.
G. V. Prakash Kumar, music composer and playback singer; son of Reihana.
Saindhavi, playback singer; wife of Prakash.
Khadija Rahman, playback singer; daughter of Rahman.
A. R. Ameen, playback singer; son of Rahman.
Azhar Kaashif, music composer; nephew of Rahman.
Rahman, actor; co-brother of Rahman.

Rajasekhar family 
Rajasekhar, actor
Jeevitha, actress; wife of Rajasekhar.
Shivani Rajasekhar, actress; daughter of Rajasekhar.
Shivathmika Rajasekhar, actress; daughter of Rajasekhar.
Selva, actor; brother of Rajasekhar.
Madhan, actor; nephew of Rajasekhar.

Rajendar family 
T. Rajendar, actor, director, music composer.
Usha Rajendar, actress; wife of Rajendar.
Silambarasan, actor; son of Rajendar.
Kuralarasan, actor and music composer; son of Rajendar.
L. V. Muthukumarasamy, music composer; cousin of Silambarasan.

Rajendra Babu family 
D. Rajendra Babu, director (d. 2013)
Sumithra, actress; wife of Rajendra Babu.
Umashankari, actress; daughter of Rajendra Babu
Nakshathra, actress; daughter of Rajendra Babu

Rajesh family 
Rajesh, actor.
Amarnath, actor; father of Rajesh.
Sri Lakshmi, actress; sister of Rajesh.
Aishwarya Rajesh, actress; daughter of Rajesh.
Manikanda Rajesh, actor; son of Rajesh.

Rajkumar family 
 Singanalluru Puttaswamiah, actor; father of Dr. Rajkumar.
 S. P. Varadappa, actor; producer; son of Singanalluru Puttaswamiah, brother of Dr. Rajkumar (d. 2006).
 Dr. Rajkumar, actor, singer, son of Singanalluru Puttaswamiah (d. 2006).
 Parvathamma Rajkumar, producer, distributor; wife of Dr. Rajkumar (d. 2017).
 S. A. Chinne Gowda, producer; brother of Parvathamma.
 Vijay Raghavendra, actor; son of Chinne Gowda.
 Sriimurali, actor; son of Chinne Gowda.
 Prashanth Neel, director; brother-in-law of Sriimurali, cousin of Ramya Raghupathi (see Nidudavolu family).
Ramya Raghupati - Cousin of Prashant Neel,2nd wife of Naresh(see Nidudavolu family).
Aadarsh Balakrishna - cousin of Prashant Neel
 Shiva Rajkumar, actor; son of Dr. Rajkumar.
 Geetha, producer, wife of Shiva Rajkumar.
 Nirupama, doctor, daughter of Shiva Rajkumar.
 Niveditha, child artist, producer, daughter of Shiva Rajkumar.
 Bangarappa, politician, father-in-law of Shiva Rajkumar (d. 2011).
 Kumar Bangarappa, actor and politician; brother-in-law of Shiva Rajkumar.
 Madhu Bangarappa: actor, producer, Ex-MLA and politician; brother-in-law of Shiva Rajkumar
 Raghavendra Rajkumar, actor, producer; son of Dr. Rajkumar.
 Mangala, wife of Raghavendra Rajkumar.
 Vinay Rajkumar, actor; son of Raghavendra Rajkumar.
 Yuva Rajkumar, actor; son of Raghavendra Rajkumar.
 Puneeth Rajkumar, actor, singer, producer, son of Dr. Rajkumar (d. 2021).
 Ashwini, producer, wife of Puneeth Rajkumar.
 Druthi, daughter of Puneeth Rajkumar.
 Vanditha, daughter of Puneeth Rajkumar.
 Poornima, child actor; daughter of Dr. Rajkumar.
 Ramkumar, actor; husband of Poornima.
 Dheeren Ramkumar, actor; son of Poornima and Ramkumar.
 Dhanya Ramkumar, actress; daughter of Poornima and Ramkumar.
 Shringar Nagaraj, actor, producer and father of Ramkumar.
 Lakshmi, daughter of Dr. Rajkumar.
 S. A. Govindraju, producer, husband of Lakshmi and brother of Parvathamma Rajkumar.
 Shan Govindraju, son of Lakshmi.
 Saraswati, daughter of Lakshmi.
 Parvathi, daughter of Lakshmi.
 S. A. Srinivas, producer, brother of Parvathamma Rajkumar.
 Suraj - Son of S. A. Srinivas 
 Balaraj, actor, nephew of Dr. Rajkumar.

Rao family 
Y. V. Rao, producer.
Rajam, actress; first wife of Rao.
Rukmani, actress; second wife of Rao.
Lakshmi, actress; daughter of Rao.
Mohan Sharma, actor; ex-husband of Lakshmi.
Sivachandran, actor; husband of Lakshmi.
Aishwarya, actress daughter of Lakshmi.

Rathnam family 
A. M. Rathnam, film producer.
Jyothi Krishna, director; son of Rathnam.
Ravi Krishna, actor; son of Rathnam.

Ravichandran family 
Ravichandran, actor.
Sheela, actress; second wife of Ravichandran.
Hamsavardhan, actor; son of Ravichandran.
Reshma, actress; wife of Hamsavardhan.
George Vishnu, actor; son of Ravichandran and Sheela.
Tanya Ravichandran, actress; granddaughter of Ravichandran.

Reddy, G. K. family 
G. K. Reddy, producer.
Vikram Krishna Reddy, producer; son of Reddy.
Sriya Reddy, actress; wife of Vikram Krishna
Vishal, actor; son of Reddy.

Reddy, Sameera family 
Sameera Reddy, actress.
Meghna Reddy, actress; sister of Sameera.
Sushma Reddy, actress; sister of Sameera.

S

Sait Family 
Tanveer Sait: Politician from Bengaluru 
Danish Sait: Host, Actor, Comedian; brother of Kubra Sait  and nephew of Tanveer Sait 
Kubra Sait: Actress, Sister of Danish Sait and niece of Tanveer Sait 
Talha Sait: Entrepreneur

Sarja family 
Shakti Prasad, actor
Kishore Sarja, director; son of Shakti Prasad.
Aparna Kishore; wife of Kishore Sarja.
Suraj Sarja, musician; son of Kishore Sarja.
Arjun Sarja, actor; director; producer; son of Shakti Prasad.
Niveditha Arjun, actress; wife of Arjun Sarja.
Rajesh, actor; father of Niveditha.
Anu Prabhakar, actress; cousin sister of Niveditha
Raghu Mukherjee, actor; husband of Anu.
Jayanthi, actress; ex-mother-in-law of Anu.
Peketi Sivaram, actor; ex-husband of Jayanthi. (see Thiagarajan family)
Aishwarya Arjun, actress; daughter of Arjun Sarja.
Anjana Arjun, producer; daughter of Arjun Sarja.
Bharat Sarja, actor; nephew of Arjun Sarja.
Pavan Teja, actor; nephew of Arjun Sarja.
Ammaji, daughter of Shakti Prasad.
Chiranjeevi Sarja, actor; son of Ammaji; grandson of Shakti Prasad.
Meghana Raj, actress; wife of Chiranjeevi Sarja.
Sundar Raj, actor; director; father of Meghana Raj.
Pramila Joshai, actor; producer; mother of Meghana Raj.
Dhruva Sarja, actor; son of Ammaji; grandson of Shakti Prasad.
Prerana Shankar; wife of Dhruva Sarja.

Sarovar Sanjeev family
Sarovar Sanjeev Manjappa, producer; actor; business man;
Kichcha Sudeep, actor; director; producer; screenwriter; singer; television presenter; cricketer; son of Sarovar Sanjeev Rao and Saroja.
Priya Radhakrishna, producer, event management group business person; wife of Sudeep.
Sanchith Sanjeev, film director; nephew of Sudeep.

Sasi family 
I. V. Sasi, director.
Seema, actress; wife of IV Sasi.
Anu Sasi, actress; daughter of IV Sasi.
Ani Sasi, director; son of IV Sasi.

Sathyaraj family 
Sathyaraj, actor.
Mathampatti Sivakumar, producer; brother of Sathyaraj.
Sibi Sathyaraj, film actor; son of Sathyaraj.
Sathyan Sivakumar, actor; nephew of Sathyaraj.

Satyanarayana family 
E. V. V. Satyanarayana, director. (d. 2011)
Allari Naresh, actor; son of Satyanarayana.
Aryan Rajesh, actor; son of Satyanarayana.
E. Satti Babu, director; cousin of Satyanarayana.

Sekhar family 
Pattiyal Sekhar, producer.
Vishnuvardhan, director; son of Sekhar
Anu Vardhan, costume designer; wife of Vishnuvardhan.
N. S. Krishnan, actor; grandfather of Anu Vardhan.
T. A. Madhuram, actress; wife of Krishnan.
Ramya NSK, singer; granddaughter of Krishnan.
K. R. Ramasamy, actor; grandfather of Ramya.
Kreshna, actor; son of Sekhar.

Siddique family 
Siddique; actor and producer
Shaheen Siddique; son of Siddique; actor

Sivaji Ganesan family 
Sivaji Ganesan, actor (d. 2001).
Ramkumar Ganesan, producer; son of Sivaji.
Prabhu, actor; son of Sivaji Ganesan.
Dushyanth Ramkumar, actor and producer; son of Ramkumar.
Vikram Prabhu, actor; son of Prabhu.
Jayalalithaa, actress; former foster mother-in-law of the granddaughter of Sivaji.
Sandhya, actress; mother of Jayalalithaa.
Thalaivan Bas, actor; brother of former foster son of Jayalalithaa.
Dharan Mandrayar, director; nephew of Sivaji.

Sivakumar family 
Sivakumar, actor.
Suriya, actor; older son of Sivakumar.
Jyothika, actress; wife of Suriya.
Nagma, actress; half-sister of Jyothika.
Roshini, actress; sister of Jyothika.
Karthi, actor; younger son of Sivakumar.
Brindha Sivakumar, Singer; Daughter of Sivakumar
Gnanavel Raja, producer; nephew of Sivakumar.
S. R. Prabhu, producer; nephew of Sivakumar.

Saluri family 
S. Rajeswara Rao, composer, multi instrumentalist, conductor singer-songwriter, actor, and music producer.
Saluri Koteswara Rao, widely known as Koti, composer, multi instrumentalist, conductor singer-songwriter, actor, and music producer, son of S. Rajeswara Rao.
Roshan Saluri, composer, singer-songwriter, actor, son of Saluri Koteswara Rao.

Susarla family 
Susarla Dakshinamurthi Sastry Sr. composer, multi instrumentalist, conductor singer-songwriter, and music producer.
Susarla Krishna Brahma Sastry composer, multi instrumentalist, conductor singer-songwriter, and music producer, son of Susarla Dakshinamurthi Sr.
Susarla Dakshinamurthi Sastry Jr. composer, multi instrumentalist, conductor singer-songwriter, and music producer, son of Susarla Krishna Brahma Sastry.

Singh Babu family 
D. Shankar Singh, director
Prathima Devi, actress; wife of Shankar Singh
Rajendra Singh Babu, director; son of Shankar Singh and Prathima Devi
Aditya, actor; son of Rajendra Singh
Rishika Singh, actress; daughter of Rajendra Singh
Vijayalakshmi Singh, director; sister of Rajendra Singh
Jai Jagadish, actor; husband of Vijayalakshmi Singh

Sreenivasan family 
Sreenivasan, actor.
Vineeth Sreenivasan, actor, director; son of Sreenivasan. 
Divya Vineeth,singer;wife of Vineeth Sreenivasan
Dhyan Sreenivasan, actor, director; son of Sreenivasan.

Sridevi family 
As the family of Sridevi have primarily appeared in Hindi films, only those who have appeared in South Indian films are listed below:

Sridevi, actress.
Boney Kapoor, Film Producer; Husband of Sridevi
Janhvi Kapoor, actress; elder daughter of Sridevi
Maheswari, actress; niece of Sridevi.
Avishek Karthik, actor; nephew of Sridevi.

SS Rajendran family 
S. S. Rajendran, actor.
C. R. Vijayakumari, actress; wife of SS Rajendran.
S. S. Rajendra Kumar, actor; son of Rajendran.
S. S. R. Kannan, actor; son of Rajendran.
S. S. R. Pankaj Kumar, actor; grandson of Rajendran.

Subramanyam family 
K. Subramanyam, director (d.1971)
S. D. Subbulakshmi, actress; wife of Subramanyam.
S. Krishnaswamy, director; son of Subramanyam.
S. V. Ramanan, director; son of Subramanyam.
Lakshmi Ravichander, wife of Ravi Raghavendra
Anirudh Ravichander, music director; son of Ravi and Lakshmi. (see Rajinikanth family)
Hrishikesh, actor; grandson of Ramanan. (see Rajinikanth family)
Padma Subrahmanyam, dancer; daughter of Subramanyam.
Raghuram, choreographer; grandson of Subrahmanyam.
Girija Raghuram, choreographer; wife of Raghuram.
Jayanthi, actress; sister of Girija.
Brindha, choreographer; sister of Girija.
Kala, choreographer; sister of Girija.
Prasanna Sujit, choreographer; nephew of Kala.
Keerthi, video jockey; niece of Kala. (see Bhagyaraj family)
Sneha, actress; former sister-in-law of Kala.
Prasanna, actor; husband of Sneha.
Suja Manoj, actress; daughter of Raguram.
Gayathri Raguram, actress; daughter of Raguram.

Sukumaran family 
Sukumaran, actor (d. 1997)
Mallika Sukumaran, actress; wife of Sukumaran. 
Indrajith, actor; son of Sukumaran.
Poornima Mohan, actress; wife of Indrajith.
 Prarthana Indrajith, playback singer; daughter of Indrajith and Poornima.
 Nakshatra Indrajith, child artist; daughter of Indrajith and Poornima.
Prithviraj, actor,director, producer; son of Sukumaran.
Supriya Menon, BBC India Reporter, producer; wife of Prithviraj.
Alankritha Menon Prithviraj, only daughter of Prithviraj and Supriya.

Sundar family 
Sundar C, director.
Khushbu, actress; wife of Sundar.
Abdullah, actor; brother of Kushboo.
Ramya Raj, actress; sister of Kushboo's sister-in-law.

Sundaram family 
Sundaram, choreographer.
Raju Sundaram, choreographer; son of Sundaram.
Prabhu Deva, actor and director; son of Sundaram.
Vishnu Deva, choreographer; nephew of Prabhu Deva
Nagendra Prasad, choreographer; son of Sundaram.

Suresh family 
Suresh Kumar, film producer.
Menaka, actress; wife of Suresh.
Revathy Suresh,  daughter of Suresh and Menaka.
Keerthy Suresh, actress; daughter of Suresh and Menaka.

Suresh Gopi family 
Suresh Gopi, actor.
Gokul Suresh, actor; son of Suresh Gopi.

T

Thiagarajan family 
Thiagarajan, actor.
Prashanth, actor; son of Thiagarajan.
Peketi Sivaram, actor; father-in-law of Thiagarajan. 
Jayanthi, actress; ex-wife of Sivaram. (see Sarja family)
Vikram, actor; nephew of Thiagarajan.
Arvind Victor John, actor; brother of Vikram.
Vinod Raj, actor; father of Vikram.
Akshita Vikram, playback singer; daughter of Vikram. (see Karunanidi family)
Dhruv Vikram, actor; playback singer; son of Vikram.
Arjuman, actor; nephew of Vikram.

Thoogudeepa family 
Thoogudeepa Srinivas, actor. (d. 1995)
Darshan, actor; son of Srinivas
Dinakar Thoogudeepa, director; son of Srinivas.
Meena Thoogudeepa Srinivas, producer; wife of Thoogudeepa Srinivas
Vijaya lakshmi Darshan, wife of Darshan Thoogudeepa
Vinish Thoogudeepa, grand son of Thoogudeepa Srinivas
Manasa Dinkar, Director; wife of Dinakar Thoogudeepa
Divya Thoogudeepa, Daughter of Thoogudeepa Srinivas

Travancore Sisters family 
Lalitha, actress; part of the Travancore Sisters
Padmini, actress; part of the Travancore Sisters
Ragini, actress; part of the Travancore Sisters
P. K. Sathyapal (Baby), producer; cousin of the Travancore Sisters
Kumari Thankam, actress;  (Wife of P. K. Sathyapal)
Latika Suresh, producer; (Daughter of Raveendran Nair) - cousin of Travancore Sisters
Shobana, actress; niece of the Travancore Sisters
Vineeth, actor; nephew of Padmini
Krishna, actor; grandson of Lalitha
Ambika Sukumaran, actress; cousin of the Travancore Sisters
Sukumari, actress; cousin of the Travancore Sisters (d. 2013) 
A. Bhimsingh, director; husband of Sukumari (d. 1978)
B. Lenin, editor; son of Bhimsingh (but not of Sukumari)
B. Kannan, cinematographer; son of Bhimsingh (but not of Sukumari)
Suresh Bhimsingh, actor; son of Bhimsingh and Sukumari

Thotakura family 
T. V. Raju composer, multi instrumentalist, conductor singer-songwriter, actor, and music producer.
Thotakura Somaraju widely known as Raj–Koti, composer, multi instrumentalist, conductor singer-songwriter, actor, and music producer, son of T. V. Raju.

U

Uppalapati family 
Suryanarayana Raju Uppalapati, Producer.
Krishnam Raju Uppalapati, elder brother of Suryanarayana; Actor, Producer.
Prabhas Raju Uppalapati, son of Suryanarayana, Actor.

V

Vairamuthu family 
Vairamuthu, poet.
Madhan Karky, poet; son of Vairamuthu.
Kabilan, poet; son of Vairamuthu.

Vasudevan family 
Malaysia Vasudevan, playback singer. (d. 2011)
Yugendran, actor; son of Vasudevan.
Hema Malini Yugendran, TV host; wife of Yugendran.
Prashanthini, playback singer; daughter of Vasudevan.

Vedantham family 
Vedantam Raghavayya- actor,Dancer, director
Vedantam Ramu-son of Raghavayya- dancer
Suryaprabha- wife of Raghavayya
Shubha- daughter  of Raghavayya
Pushpavalli- sister of Suryaprabha
Gemini Ganesan- partner of Pushpavalli.
Rekha (Bhanurekha Ganesan)- daughter of Pushpavalli

Veeraswamy family 
N. Veeraswamy, producer. (d. 1992)
V. Ravichandran, actor, director and music composer; son of Veeraswamy
Manoranjan Ravichandran, actor; son of Ravichandran
Vikram Ravichandran; 2nd Son Of Ravichandran
Balaji (Kannada actor), actor; brother of Ravichandran

Vijayakanth family 
Vijayakanth, actor.
Premalatha Vijayakanth|Premalatha, producer; wife of Vijayakanth.
Shanmuga Pandian, actor; son of Vijayakanth.
Vijay Prabhakaran, son of Vijayakanth.

Vijayakumar family 
1. Vijayakumar, actor.
2. Manjula Vijayakumar, actress. (d. 2013)
3. Arun Vijay, actor; son of Vijayakumar.
4. N. S. Mohan, producer; father-in-law of Arun.
5. Hemanth, actor; son of Mohan.
Kavitha Vijayakumar, actress; daughter of Vijayakumar.
7. Vanitha Vijayakumar, actress; daughter of Vijayakumar.
Akash, actor; ex-husband of Vanitha.
9. Robert, choreographer; ex-partner of Vanitha.
10. Peter Paul, visual effects director; ex-husband of Vanitha
11. Alphonsa, actress; sister of Robert.
12. Preetha Vijayakumar, actress; daughter of Vijayakumar.
13. Hari, director; husband of Preetha.
14. Sridevi Vijayakumar, actress; daughter of Vijayakumar.
15. Sanjeev, actor; nephew of Manjula Vijayakumar.
Preethi, actress; wife of Sanjeev.
17. Sindhu, actress; niece of Manjula Vijayakumar. (d. 2005)
Rishi, actor; husband of Sindhu.
19. Raghuveer, actor; ex-husband of Sindhu. (d. 2014)

Vishnuvardhan family 
Vishnuvardhan, actor.
Bharathi Vishnuvardhan, actress; wife of Vishnuvardhan .
Keerthi Vishnuvardhan, Costume Designer; Daughter Of Vishnuvardhan.
Anirudha, actor; son-in-law of Vishnuvardhan.

Vyjayanthimala family 
Vyjayanthimala, actress.
Vasunthara Devi, actress; mother of Vyjayanthimala.
Suchindra Bali, actor; son of Vyjayanthimala.
Y. Gee. Mahendra, actor; cousin of Vyjayanthimala. (see Rajinikanth family)

References 

Film, South India
Families, South India
South Indian film
Film families
Film families
 
South India